Martha Ontaneda Miranda is an Ecuadorian actress, producer, and director.

Biography
Martha Ontaneda was born to Miguel Ángel Ontaneda and Colombia Miranda. She has three daughters, and has been married twice, currently to Roberto Mastalir.

Ontaneda entered the theatrical world in 1983 with her participation in the puppet theater group Arcoiris. She began acting in 1986 as a substitute for another actress in the play La casa de Bernarda Alba in Teatro Experimental de Guayaquil.

Citations

Ecuadorian film actresses
Ecuadorian film directors
20th-century Ecuadorian actresses
21st-century Ecuadorian actresses